A 2-4-6-2 steam locomotive, in the Whyte notation for describing locomotive wheel arrangements, has a two-wheel leading truck, one set of four driving wheels, one set of six driving wheels, and a two-wheel trailing truck.

Other equivalent classifications are:
UIC classification: 1BC1 (also known as German classification and Italian classification)
French classification: 1231

This most unusual wheel arrangement was only ever used on a duplex locomotive type.
  
Ten 2-4-6-2 (151A) compound locomotives were built in 1932 for the Paris-Lyons-Marseilles Railway (P.L.M.) to haul heavy freight trains on the 0.8% grade between Les Laumes and Dijon.  After electrification of the line, the 151A were sent for service in northeastern France.  They were withdrawn from service in 1956 and scrapped.

46,2-4-6-2
Railway locomotives introduced in 1932